Franziska Hildebrand (born 24 March 1987) is a German biathlete. Hildebrand started in her first world cup races in the 2011/12-season after winning three medals at the two previous European Championships. In 2014, she participated in the Winter Olympics in Sochi. She was officially nominated by the DOSB on 23 January 2014. She retired after 2021/2022, one day after she announced pregnancy.

Record

Olympic Games

World Championships

References

External links

 
 
 
 

1987 births
Living people
Sportspeople from Halle (Saale)
People from Bezirk Halle
German female biathletes
Olympic biathletes of Germany
Biathletes at the 2014 Winter Olympics
Biathletes at the 2018 Winter Olympics
Biathlon World Championships medalists
Universiade medalists in biathlon
Universiade silver medalists for Germany
Competitors at the 2011 Winter Universiade
21st-century German women